Anupam Shyam Ojha (20 September 1957 – 8 August 2021) was an Indian film and television actor, who usually played villainous roles. He appeared as Sajjan Singh Thakur in the STAR Plus TV series Mann Kee Awaaz Pratigya (2009 and 2021). Apart from that, he worked in films like Lajja, Nayak, Dubai Return, Parzania, Hazaaron Khwaishein Aisi (2005), Shakti: The Power, Bandit Queen, in the internationally acclaimed movie Slumdog Millionaire (2008) and acted in numerous international films set in India. He last appeared in Star Bharat' s popular series Mann Kee Awaaz Pratigya 2.

Personal life
Anupam Shyam Ojha was a native of Pratapgarh in Uttar Pradesh, and an alumnus of Bhartendu Academy of Dramatic Arts, Lucknow, where he studied from 1983 to 1985. He also supported Anna Hazare's movement held on 27 December 2011.

Death
He died aged 63 on 8 August 2021, at Life Line Hospital due to kidney failure, approximately 45 days before his 64th birthday.

Filmography

 Sardari Begum (1996)
 Dastak (1996)
 Jaya Ganga (1996)
 Tamanna (1997)
 Daava (1997)
 Hazaar Chaurasi Ki Maa (1998)
 Dushman (1998)
 Satya (1998)
 Dil Se.. (1998)
 Such a Long Journey (1998)
 Zakhm (1998)
 Pyaar To Hona Hi Tha (1998)
 Kachche Dhaage (1999)
 Sangharsh (1999)
 Lagaan (2001)
 Love Ke Liye Kuch Bhi Karega (2001)
 Nayak: The Real Hero (2001)
 Shakti: The Power (2002)
 Thakshak' Market (2003)
  Mulit (Short) (2003)
 Paap (2004)
 Hanan (2004)
 Hazaaron Khwaishein Aisi (2005)
 Sab Kuch Hai Kuch Bhi Nahin (2005)
 The Rising: Ballad of Mangal Pandey (2005)
 Parzania (2005)
 Jigyaasa (2006)
 The Curse of King Tut's Tomb (2006)
 Golmaal (2006)
 Dhokha (2007)
 Halla Bol (2008)
 Slumdog Millionaire (2008)
 Raaz – The Mystery Continues (2009)
 Well Done Abba (2009)
 Wanted (2009)
 Rakta Charitra I (2010)
 Rakta Charitra II (2010)
 Kajraare (2010)
 Akeli (2014)
 Gandhigiri (Movie) (2015)
 Munna Michael (2017)
706 (2019)

Television
 Doordarshan's Astitva Ek Pehchaan as Inspector Shakti Singh
 Amaravati ki Kathayein ... by Shyam Benegal (1995) Episode No. 4-Bus-Thief arrested by police constable/ Episode No. 8 Diwali-Punaiya/ Episode No. 12- Thief - Vinaiyya
 Amma and Family (1995)... Abdul Hamid
Doordarshan's Jai Hanuman 1997...Rakshas
 Rishtey (Season 3) (2005)
 Kyunki...Jeena Issi Ka Naam Hai (2008) 
 Mann Kee Awaaz Pratigya (2009)... Sajjan Singh Thakur
 Welcome - Baazi Mehmaan-Nawaazi Ki (2013)... Himself
 Hum Ne Li Hai- Shapath (2013)... Bhai Saheb
 Doli Armaano Ki (2014)... Tau ji
 Krishna Chali London (2018–19)... Lambodar "Dadda" Shukla
 Mann Kee Awaaz Pratigya 2 (2021)... Sajjan Singh Thakur

References

External links
 

1957 births
2021 deaths
Indian male film actors
Male actors in Hindi cinema
Indian male television actors
People from Pratapgarh, Uttar Pradesh
Indian male soap opera actors
Bharatendu Academy of Dramatic Arts alumni
Male actors from Uttar Pradesh